These Old Charms is the debut album by Canadian Idol finalist Theresa Sokyrka, released across Canada on April 26, 2005.

Album information
The album includes favorites she had performed on Idol, a number of old jazz standards, as well as three original songs written by Sokyrka herself.

Reception 
It debuted at #4 on the Canadian charts and was certified gold in June 2005.

Awards and nominations
These Old Charms was also nominated for a Juno Award in the category of Pop Album of the Year against Jann Arden and (ultimate winner) Michael Bublé as well as fellow Canadian Idol Kalan Porter.

Track listing
 "Angel Eyes"
 "This Masquerade"
 "God Bless The Child"
 "Corcovado (Quiet Nights Of Quiet Stars)"
 "Summertime"
 "Come Away With Me"
 "She Let Her Hair Down"
 "Change The World"
 "Turned My Back"
 "Cruisin'"
 "Good Mother"

2005 debut albums
Theresa Sokyrka albums
MapleMusic Recordings albums